Matthias Zimmermann (born 14 September 1970 in Trostberg) is a German former footballer. He played for two seasons in the Bundesliga with SpVgg Unterhaching.

Honours
FC Bayern Munich II
IFA Shield: 2005

References

1970 births
Living people
German footballers
SV Wacker Burghausen players
FC Bayern Munich II players
SpVgg Unterhaching players
Association football midfielders